Hansen's Sno-Bliz is a snowball stand located in New Orleans, Louisiana, U.S.A., on Tchoupitoulas Street at Bordeaux Street.
 
It opened in 1934 and is believed to be the 2nd oldest sno-ball stand in the United States after Walther Gardens (Baltimore, 1928).  It has been operated continuously by the Hansen family.  After Hurricane Katrina and the subsequent death of founders Ernest and Mary Hansen, the shop closed for some time before being reopened by their granddaughter Ashley Hansen, in early summer of 2006.  The shop is open annually from March to October.

In 2014, Hansen's received an America's Classics award at the James Beard Foundation Awards.

Sno-balls in Louisiana are similar to what the rest of the country calls snow cones, but they are made with more-finely-shaved ice and a large variety of homemade syrups.

The Ice Shaving Machine
Ernest Hansen built Hansen's ice-shaving machine himself, entitled the "Sno-Bliz" in the 1930s. It was the first ever block-ice shaver. The U.S. government granted the patent in 1950. 

The machine currently in use today was built by Ernest Hansen in 1939.

References

External links
 Official website
  Review of Hansen's Sno-Bliz at Roadfood.com
 "Let It Sno: The Torch Is Passed for an Icy New Orleans Tradition", Gambit, May 30, 2006, archived by the Wayback Machine here

Restaurants in New Orleans
Uptown New Orleans
Restaurants established in 1934
James Beard Foundation Award winners
1934 establishments in Louisiana